Harramiz Quieta Ferreira Soares (born 3 August 1990), known simply as Harramiz, is a Santoméan professional footballer who plays for Portuguese club Torreense and the São Tomé and Príncipe national team as a forward.

He spent most of his career in Portugal's second tier, playing over 200 games across seven clubs. He also appeared in two Primeira Liga matches for Tondela in 2018.

Club career
Harramiz was born in São Tomé. In June 2013, after starting his senior career in Portugal's lower leagues, he moved straight into the Primeira Liga when he joined S.L. Benfica, for a fee of €15,000.

Harramiz was initially assigned to the B team in the Segunda Liga. On 10 August 2013, aged 23, he played his first game as a professional, featuring the full 90 minutes and being booked in a 0–0 away draw against C.D. Trofense. Eleven days later, in another away fixture, he scored his first league goal, contributing to a 2–2 draw with S.C. Beira-Mar.

On 31 August 2014, Harramiz was loaned to S.C. Farense in a season-long deal, Six of his eight goals came during the last month of competition, and the Algarve team finally ranked in 11th place.

In the following years, Harramiz continued to compete in the second division, with S.C. Covilhã and Académica de Coimbra. On 31 January 2018, he returned to the top flight after signing with C.D. Tondela until 30 June, and he made his debut in the competition on 26 February by coming on as a late substitute in a 1–0 loss at S.C. Braga.

On 31 July 2018, Harramiz returned to division two with C.D. Mafra. Having scored a joint personal best ten goals in his one season, he moved on to Leixões SC.

Harramiz cut his ties with Leixões on 1 October 2020 and made his way to G.D. Estoril Praia; he had played against that club four days earlier. The following 27 January, he scored away to top-tier C.S. Marítimo in a 3–1 extra time win as his side reached the semi-finals of the Taça de Portugal.
 
In July 2021, after winning the second division with Estoril, Harramiz left Portuguese football for the first time to sign for Neftçi PFK in Azerbaijan; he was joined in Baku by teammate Hugo Basto. On 21 January 2022, he left after making 11 appearances.

On 31 January 2023, Harramiz signed with Torreense in Liga Portugal 2 until the end of the season.

International career
Harramiz earned his first cap for São Tomé and Príncipe on 5 September 2015, starting in a 0–3 home loss to Morocco for the 2017 Africa Cup of Nations qualifiers.

Career statistics

Club

International goals
 (São Tomé and Príncipe score listed first, score column indicates score after each Harramiz goal)

Honours
Estoril
Liga Portugal 2: 2020–21

References

External links

1990 births
Living people
People from São Tomé
São Tomé and Príncipe footballers
Association football forwards
Primeira Liga players
Liga Portugal 2 players
O Elvas C.A.D. players
União Montemor players
S.L. Benfica B players
S.C. Farense players
S.C. Covilhã players
Associação Académica de Coimbra – O.A.F. players
C.D. Tondela players
C.D. Mafra players
Leixões S.C. players
G.D. Estoril Praia players
Azerbaijan Premier League players
Neftçi PFK players
S.C.U. Torreense players
São Tomé and Príncipe international footballers
São Tomé and Príncipe expatriate footballers
Expatriate footballers in Portugal
Expatriate footballers in Azerbaijan
São Tomé and Príncipe expatriate sportspeople in Portugal